Ilino may refer to the following villages:
 Ilino (Goražde), Bosnia and Herzegovina
 Ilino, Resen, North Macedonia
 Ilino, Masovian Voivodeship, Poland
 Ilino, Boljevac, Serbia

See also
 Ilyino (disambiguation) for localities in Russia